J. Maurice LeClair  (June 19, 1927 – April 25, 2020) was a Canadian physician, businessman, civil servant, and academic.

Biography 
Born in Sayabec, Quebec, he received a Bachelor of Science degree in 1947 and a Doctor of Medicine degree in 1951 from McGill University. In 1953, he became a General Practitioner in Shawinigan, Quebec. In 1955, he became a Fellow at the Mayo Clinic and received a Master of Science in Medicine in 1958 from the University of Minnesota. Returning to Canada in 1958, he became a consulting internist at the Notre Dame Hospital.

In 1962, he became Vice Dean of the Faculty of Medicine at the Université de Montréal and Head of the department in 1965. In 1968, he became Dean of the Faculty of Medicine at the Université de Sherbrooke. From 1968 to 1970, he was Vice President of the Medical Research Council of Canada.

From 1970 to 1974, LeClair was Deputy Minister of Health. In 1974, he joined the Ministry of Science and Technology and the Treasury Board in 1976.

In 1979, he joined the Canadian National Railway as a Corporate Vice President becoming President and Chief Executive Officer from 1982 to 1986. From 1987 to 1992, he was the Vice-Chairman of CIBC.

Honours 
 In 1980, he was made an Officer of the Order of Canada.
 In 1985, he was promoted to Companion of the Order of Canada.
 In 2004, he was inducted into the Canadian Medical Hall of Fame.

References

 
 
 
 

1927 births
2020 deaths
20th-century Canadian civil servants
Canadian National Railway executives
Canadian general practitioners
Canadian university and college faculty deans
McGill University Faculty of Medicine alumni
University of Minnesota alumni
Companions of the Order of Canada
People from Bas-Saint-Laurent